There have been two baronetcies created for persons with the surname Carlile, both in the Baronetage of the United Kingdom. Both titles became extinct on the death of the first baronet.

Carlile baronets, of Ponsbourne Park, Herts (1917) 

 Sir Edward Hildred Carlile, 1st Baronet (1852–1942), Member of Parliament (MP) for St Albans 1906–1919

Carlile baronets, of Gayhurst, Bucks (1928) 

 Sir William Walter Carlile, 1st Baronet (1862–1928), Member of Parliament (MP) for Buckingham 1895–1906

References

Extinct baronetcies in the Baronetage of the United Kingdom